Priyankara Rathnayake (born June 3, 1964 as ) is an actor in Sri Lankan cinema, stage drama and television. Highly versatile actor mostly engaged in theater and cinema, Rathnayake is a lecturer and Head of Drama & Theatre and image Arts Unit, Department of Fine Arts in University of Kelaniya by profession.

Personal life
He started drama career under Somalatha Subasinghe's children and youth theater and state drama school. Then he joined Rajitha Dissanayake's drama troupe.

He entered to University of Kelaniya in 1989 and obtained the Bachelor of Arts Special Degree (Honours) in 1992. He completed Master of Arts Degree in Drama and Theatre from University of Sri Jayewardenepura in 2005. He is working as a lecturer and visiting lecturer for mass media, drama and theater as well as performing arts in University of Peradeniya, National School of Drama, Tower Hall Theatre Foundation and Sripalee campus of University of Colombo.

Acting career
Rathnayake is credited for introducing famous plays by Sophocles to the Sri Lankan theater with the titles Oedipus and Ada Vage Davasaka Antigone. He also directed Aristophanes' play Lysistrata in 2015 as Visekariyo. In 2016, he directed William Shakespeare’s A Midsummer Night’s Dream with the title Premawantha Kumarayo.

In 2016, a four-day theater festival was held at the Lionel Wendt Theatre in Colombo from June 7 to 10 daily at 7 pm.

Notable works
 Ada Vage Davasaka Antigone
 Asinamali
 Bakamuna Weedi Basi 
 Oedipus
 Poth Gullee
 Premawantha Kumarayo
 Sihina Horu Aran
 Visekariyo

Selected television serials
 Abhisamaya
 Ahanna Kenek Na 
 Charithayaka Paata Denna
 Dhawala Yamaya
 Diya Ginisilu 
 Giri Kula
 Kadadora
 Maheshika
 Manikkawatha 
 Sakarma 
 Satya 
 Sulangata Enna Kiyanna
 Vishwanthari

Author work
He wrote several books related to drama and media. One of them is Natya Vicharaya.

Filmography
Rathnayake started his film career with Thunweni Aha back in 1996, directed by Anura Chandrasiri. His most popular cinema acting came through films Irasma, Bandhanaya and Dedunu Akase.

Awards and accolades
He has won several awards at the local stage drama festivals and television festivals.

Presidential Awards

|-
|| 1999 ||| Dorakada Marawa || Best Screenplay ||

Sumathi Awards

|-
|| 2001 ||| Abhisamaya || Merit Award ||

Raigam Tele'es

|-
|| 2012 ||| Sulangata Enna Kiyanna  Kadadora || Merit Award ||

References

External links
 Drama Festival by Priyankara Rathnayake
 අපේ වේදිකාවේ වෘත්තීය නළුවෝ නැහැ
 සම්භාව්‍ය කෘති තුළ තමයි මිනිසුන්ට විනෝදයත් සමග දැනුවත් කිරීමේ ඥානය ලබා දිය හැකි උපරිම දේවල් තියෙන්න
 ප්‍රියංකර රත්නායක පුදුමයට පත් කළ මෙරට වේදිකාවේ විශිෂ්ටතම නාට්‍ය හත
 මුළු සමාජයමටම අද බරපතල ප්‍රතිසංස්කරණයක් අවශයයි
 යකැදුරාගේ සිට නාට්‍යවේදියා දක්වා

Sri Lankan male film actors
Sinhalese male actors
Living people
Sri Lankan male stage actors
1964 births